RCAF Station Mount Pleasant was a Royal Canadian Air Force (RCAF) station in Mount Pleasant, Prince Edward Island, Canada.  Two of its runways remain in use by members of the Experimental Aircraft Association.

World War II
The aerodrome opened during World War II in 1940 under the auspices of the British Commonwealth Air Training Plan (BCATP). It was intended to serve as a relief landing field for No. 9 Service Flying Training School, which was located at nearby RCAF Station Summerside.

In September 1943, RCAF Station Mount Pleasant evolved from a relief field to a full training facility when it began hosting No. 10 Bombing and Gunnery School (B&GS). Aircraft used for this training include the Avro Anson, Fairey Battle, Bristol Bolingbroke and Westland Lysander. No. 10 B&GS ceased operation in June 1945.

The airfield was used as a storage depot for a short time before being decommissioned by the RCAF in 1947.

Aerodrome information
The airfield was constructed in the typical BCATP wartime pattern, with runways formed in a triangle.
Three runways were listed as follows:

References

 Bruce Forsyth's Canadian Military History page

Canadian Forces bases in Canada (closed)
Royal Canadian Air Force stations
Airports of the British Commonwealth Air Training Plan
Transport in Prince County, Prince Edward Island
Defunct airports in Prince Edward Island
Military airbases in Prince Edward Island
Military history of Prince Edward Island